Zaragoza is a municipality in the Mexican state of Puebla. Zaragoza was named after the city of Zaragoza, Spain, since among the first settlers of the place families were some of the city from Aragon. That is why today in Zaragoza is dedicated to the Virgen del Pilar, patron de la Hispanidad.

History 
The legends and stories that have this great magnificent city are quite complex. Zaragoza identifies what is the train or the tracks that were left to remember the train today. Zaragoza was once a hacienda which was exchanged for merchandise, after Spanish arrived they began to settle, built houses and more. Zaragoza decided to name it for the honor of Spain.

Weather 
The territory involved in the temperate zone of the Sierra Norte, has four climatic variations. Since semi-cold humid climate with summer rains (ce) (W2), the mean annual temperature between 5 and 12 °C, the temperature of the coldest month from less than 3 and 18 °C. Those whose dry month precipitation is less than 40 millimeters, and a percentage of winter precipitation over the year, between 5 and 10.2 mm. Occur in the mountainous southeast. Humid temperate climate (w '9) (w), with summer rainfall, with mean annual temperature between 12 and 18 °C., temperature of the coldest month from less than 3 and 18 °C, rate of precipitation during winter regarding the annual 5 to 10.2. Is the predominant climate is observed in the middle. The humid temperate climate (CM), with summer rainfall, mean annual temperature between 12 and 10 °C, temperature of the coldest month, from less than 3 and 18 °C, precipitation of driest month less than 40 mm, and the percentage of precipitation winter with respect to annual more than 5 mm. It comes in a strip north of town.

Towns 
The population of Zaragoza is the capital of the homonymous municipality and under its jurisdiction are the following locations: Acuacar, Colonia Morelos, El Porvenir, El Retiro, Las Trancas, San José Buenavista, and Xalehuala.

Municipalities of Puebla